Anasi may refer to:

Anasi language
Anası Kızından
Robert Anasi